The Jersey Society for the Prevention of Cruelty to Animals (also referred to as the JSPCA, Jersey SPCA), founded , is a nonprofit organization based in Jersey, with the aims of preventing cruelty, promoting knowledge, and providing for aged, sick, lost and unwanted animals within Jersey.

References

1868 establishments in Jersey
Organizations established in 1868
Animal welfare organisations based in Jersey